National Secondary Route 252, is an arterial road from Route 2 to Route 210 in Curridabat.

Description

History

From the Curridabat west endpoint, there have been plans of either building a tunnel to the Garantías Sociales roundabout of Route 39 or an elevated highway to Route 215 in Zapote district.

References

Highways in Costa Rica